The law of Massachusetts consists of several levels, including constitutional, statutory, regulatory, case law, and local ordinances. The General Laws of Massachusetts form the general statutory law.

Sources 

The Constitution of Massachusetts is the foremost source of state law. Legislation is enacted by the General Court, published in the Acts and Resolves of Massachusetts, and codified in the General Laws of Massachusetts. State agency regulations (sometimes called administrative law) are published in the Massachusetts Register and codified in the Code of Massachusetts Regulations. The legal system is based on common law, which is interpreted by case law through the decisions of the Massachusetts Supreme Judicial Court, the Massachusetts Appeals Court, and the Appellate Divisions of the Massachusetts District Court and the Boston Municipal Court departments, which are published in the Massachusetts Reports, Massachusetts Appeals Court Reports, and Massachusetts Appellate Division Reports, respectively. Cities and towns may also promulgate bylaws and local ordinances.

Constitution 
The foremost source of state law is the Constitution of Massachusetts. The Massachusetts Constitution in turn is subordinate to the Constitution of the United States, which is the supreme law of the land.

Legislation 
Pursuant to the state constitution, the Massachusetts General Court has enacted legislation. Its session laws are published in the official Acts and Resolves of Massachusetts. They are in turn codified as the General Laws of Massachusetts.

Regulations 
Pursuant to certain statutes, state agencies have promulgated regulations, which along with administrative orders and decisions form part of the body of administrative law. The Massachusetts Register is the bi-weekly publication that contains new and amended (permanent and emergency) regulations, notices of hearings and comment periods, notices of public interest, executive orders by the Governor, Attorney General opinions, a cumulative table of changes to regulations published during the current calendar year, and a list of Acts and Resolves passed by the General Court. The Code of Massachusetts Regulations (CMR) is the canonical compilation of regulations promulgated by state agencies pursuant to the Administrative Procedures Act and is updated through the Massachusetts Register. Both the Code of Massachusetts Regulations and Massachusetts Register are published by the Secretary of the Commonwealth.

Case law 
The legal system of Massachusetts is based on the common law. Like all U.S. states except Louisiana, Massachusetts has a reception statute providing for the "reception" of English law. All statutes, regulations, and ordinances are subject to judicial review. Pursuant to common law tradition, the courts of Massachusetts have developed a large body of case law through the decisions of the Massachusetts Supreme Judicial Court and Massachusetts Appeals Court. The decisions of the Massachusetts Supreme Judicial Court, the Massachusetts Appeals Court, and the Appellate Divisions of the Massachusetts District Court and the Boston Municipal Court departments, which are published in the Massachusetts Reports, Massachusetts Appeals Court Reports, and Massachusetts Appellate Division Reports, respectively. The Massachusetts Law Reporter publishes decisions from the Massachusetts Superior Court. MassCourts is the case management system used by the courts.

Local ordinances

See also

Topics 
 Alcohol laws of Massachusetts
 Cannabis in Massachusetts
 Capital punishment in Massachusetts
 Elder law (Massachusetts)
 Gun laws in Massachusetts
 LGBT rights in Massachusetts

Other 
 Politics of Massachusetts
 Law enforcement in Massachusetts
 Crime in Massachusetts
 Law of the United States

References

External links 
 General Laws of Massachusetts from the Massachusetts General Court
 General Laws of Massachusetts archives from the State Library of Massachusetts
 Code of Massachusetts Regulations  from the Massachusetts Secretary of the Commonwealth
 Code of Massachusetts Regulations from the Massachusetts Trial Court Law Libraries
 Acts and Resolves of Massachusetts from the State Library of Massachusetts
 Acts and Resolves of Massachusetts from the Internet Archive
 Session laws from the Massachusetts General Court
 Massachusetts Register  from the Massachusetts Secretary of the Commonwealth
 Massachusetts Register from the State Library of Massachusetts
 Massachusetts Reports from the Massachusetts Trial Court Law Libraries
 Massachusetts Appeals Court Reports from the Massachusetts Trial Court Law Libraries
 Massachusetts Appellate Division Reports from the Massachusetts Trial Court Law Libraries
 Slip opinions of the Massachusetts Supreme Judicial Court and Massachusetts Appeals Court
 Unpublished decisions of the Massachusetts Appeals Court
 Local ordinance codes from Public.Resource.Org
 Case law: 

 
Massachusetts